Louis Sydney Woolf (28 July 1855 – 6 July 1942) was an Australian cricketer and barrister. He played one first-class cricket match for Victoria in 1878.

Life and career
Woolf was born in the inner Melbourne suburb of Fitzroy, and attended Scotch College and the University of Melbourne. He was admitted to the Victorian Bar in 1876. He specialised in divorce cases and was an authority on divorce law. 

Woolf played district cricket for South Melbourne as a batsman and, in the early part of his career, a specialist longstop fieldsman. As the cricket historian Ray Robinson explained, in those days of rough pitches, "enough awkward balls careered past wicketkeepers to require the longstop to be a man of tough hands and a brave heart, not to be panicked by shin-threatening skids and treacherous bounces. Such a man was Melbourne barrister Lou Woolf, a champion in the position." One day in the 1870s, while fielding at longstop for South Melbourne to the wicket-keeping of Jack Blackham, Woolf found he had nothing to do because Blackham was stopping everything, so he asked if he could move to a more useful position in the field. That day Blackham became the first keeper to do without a longstop, and he went on to carry the innovation into first-class and Test cricket. Within a few years longstop was virtually obsolete.

Woolf married Alice Maud Isaacs in Melbourne in April 1890. At the time of his death in July 1942 aged 86 he was Victoria’s oldest practising barrister and Victoria’s oldest representative cricketer. Alice died in July 1953, survived by their son and daughter.

See also
 List of Victoria first-class cricketers

References

External links
 

1855 births
1942 deaths
People educated at Scotch College, Melbourne
Melbourne Law School alumni
Australian cricketers
Victoria cricketers
Cricketers from Melbourne
Australian barristers